Karalılar, also spelled Karalylar or Qaralılar, is a Turkic word. It may refer to:

 Qaralılar, Beylagan, Beylagan Rayon, Azerbaijan
 Qaralar, Shamkir, Shamkir Rayon, Azerbaijan, also called Karalylar

See also
 Karalar (disambiguation)

bună dimineața